The Reuben Herzfeld House, also known as Herzfeld-Harpst-Payne House and Mistletoe Bough, is a historic mansion in Alexander City, Alabama, U.S.. It was built from 1890 to 1895 for Reuben Herzfeld, a German-born immigrant, and it was designed in the Queen Anne architectural style. It has been listed on the National Register of Historic Places since August 22, 1995.

References

Houses on the National Register of Historic Places in Alabama
Queen Anne architecture in Alabama
Houses completed in 1890
Houses in Tallapoosa County, Alabama
1890 establishments in Alabama
National Register of Historic Places in Tallapoosa County, Alabama